Restless Breed is the fourth album by American heavy metal band Riot, released in 1982, and their first with vocalist Rhett Forrester. "When I Was Young" is an Eric Burdon and the Animals' cover.

Restless Breed was first re-issued on CD in 1997 by Germany's High Vaultage label, including the Riot Live 6-song EP as bonus tracks. A stateside re-issue followed in 1999 on Metal Blade Records, albeit sans the EP bonus tracks.

Metal Blade would re-issue the album a second time in 2016, this time including the Riot Live EP as bonus tracks.
Rock Candy Records reissued a remastered CD of the album in 2019

Track listing

2016 CD edition bonus tracks

Personnel

Band members
 Rhett Forrester - vocals, harmonica
 Mark Reale - guitar
 Rick Ventura - guitar
 Kip Leming - bass
 Sandy Slavin - drums

Production
Steve Loeb, Billy Arnell - producers
Rod Hui - engineer
Frank Scilingo - assistant engineer
Howie Weinberg - mastering

References

Riot V albums
1982 albums
Elektra Records albums